Kenure is a cricket ground in Rush, Fingal in Ireland.  The first recorded match on the ground was in 1997, when Ireland Under-23s Women played New South Wales Schools Women.  In 2000, the ground hosted two Women's One Day Internationals between Ireland women and Pakistan women.  In 2002, the ground held a Women's One Day International between Ireland women and India women.  Later in 2008, the ground held a Women's Twenty20 International between Ireland women and West Indies women, which West Indies women won by 75 runs.

The ground is located on part of the old Kenure House estate and is the home ground of Rush Cricket Club since 1969.

References

External links
Kenure, Rush, Dublin at CricketArchive

Cricket grounds in the Republic of Ireland
Sports venues in Fingal
Sports venues completed in 1997
Cricket grounds in County Dublin